John Barry Turner (April 11, 1946 – October 20, 2021) was a Canadian politician and lobbyist.

Born in Ottawa, Ontario, Turner was elected to the House of Commons of Canada in Brian Mulroney's massive sweep in the 1984 election in which the Progressive Conservative Party of Canada won more seats than any party before or since.

Turner was elected to the riding of Ottawa—Carleton, which has been a traditional Liberal seat, and was once the riding of then Prime Minister John Turner (no relation), who left parliament in 1976 and was seeking election in Vancouver, British Columbia.  Turner was defeated in his bid for re-election in 1988 by future Deputy Prime Minister John Manley in the new riding of Ottawa South.

Barry Turner has been a lobbyist for Ducks Unlimited in recent years. He was briefly nominated as a candidate for the Conservative Party of Canada for the 2006 Canadian federal election but decided not to stand. He died on October 20, 2021 from cancer.

Electoral results

References

Notes
 

1946 births
2021 deaths
Canadian lobbyists
Members of the House of Commons of Canada from Ontario
Politicians from Ottawa
Progressive Conservative Party of Canada MPs